Misapata (Quechua misa table, pata elevated place; above, at the top;  edge, bank, shore, also spelled  Mesapata) is a mountain in the Andes of Peru, about  high. It is situated in the Ayacucho Region, Lucanas Province, on the border of the districts of Cabana and Lucanas. It lies southwest of Anqasi and Inka Wasi.

References 

Mountains of Peru
Mountains of Ayacucho Region